{{DISPLAYTITLE:386MAX}}

386MAX (originally 386 to the Max, later Qualitas MAX) is a computer memory manager for DOS-based personal computers. It competed with Quarterdeck's QEMM memory manager. It was manufactured by Qualitas.

BlueMax was a special version designed for the IBM PS/2 with ROM compression to get the most of the Upper Memory Blocks.

In 2022, the source code was made available on GitHub, and released under the GNU GPL v3 license by Bob Smith of Sudley Place Software. It joined other tools that Smith had originally written at Qualitas which had their source code released in 2012:
 DPMIONE, a DPMI 1.0 host component
 386SWAT, a protected-mode debugger
 QLINK, a linker tool written to handle 32-bit data types, in support of the 386SWAT program

See also
 MSDPMI

References

External links
 Qualitas support page
 DPMIONE Documentation File Version 0.91
 386MAX source code on GitHub

Expanded memory managers